Sunflower is an album by vibraphonist Milt Jackson recorded in 1972 and released on the CTI label. Assisting Jackson are trumpeter Freddie Hubbard, a star-studded rhythm section composed chiefly of Miles Davis alumni, and, on the first track, string and woodwind accompaniment, courtesy of Don Sebesky.

In 1997, Sunflower was reissued on compact disc under Sony Music Entertainment by was of their catalog label Legacy Recordings and Epic Records.

Reception
The Allmusic review by Thom Jurek awarded the album 4½ stars stating "While Sunflower sometimes feels more like a group session rather than a Jackson-led one, that's part of its exquisite beauty".  Reviewing a 1979 LP reissue for The Los Angeles Times, jazz writer Leonard Feather assigned it 4 stars, noting that "[t]he reissues on CTI continue to remind us how much vibrant talent was brought together on that label in its pre-fusion days."

Track listing
All compositions by Milt Jackson except where noted
 "For Someone I Love (What's Your Story)" - 10:20 
 "What Are You Doing the Rest of Your Life?" (Alan Bergman, Marilyn Bergman, Michel Legrand) - 7:06 
 "People Make the World Go Round" (Thom Bell, Linda Creed) - 8:28 
 "Sunflower" (Freddie Hubbard) - 10:01 
 "SKJ" - 6:47 Bonus track on CD reissue
Recorded at Rudy Van Gelder Studio in Englewood Cliffs, New Jersey on December 12 & 13, 1972

Personnel
Milt Jackson – vibes
Freddie Hubbard - trumpet, flugelhorn
Herbie Hancock - piano
Jay Berliner - guitar
Ron Carter - bass
Billy Cobham - drums
Ralph MacDonald - percussion
Romeo Penque - alto flute, English horn, oboe
Phil Bodner - flute, alto flute, piccolo, English horn
George Marge - clarinet, bass clarinet, alto flute, English horn
Max Ellen, Paul Gershman, Emanuel Green, Charles Libove, Joe Malin, David Nadien, Gene Orloff, Elliot Rosoff, Irving Spice - violin
Charles McCraken, George Ricci, Alan Shulman - cello
Margaret Ross - harp
Don Sebesky - arranger, conductor

References 

CTI Records albums
Milt Jackson albums
Albums arranged by Don Sebesky
1973 albums
Albums produced by Creed Taylor
Albums recorded at Van Gelder Studio